Brian Goeltzenleuchter is an American conceptual artist and educator who works 

in olfactory art, social practice, and image making.

Early life and education 
Goeltzenleuchter was born in San Diego, California. In 2001 he received a Masters of Fine Arts from the University of California San Diego where he studied under David Antin and Allan Kaprow.

Art 
Goeltzenleuchter's work has been exhibited at multiple locations such as The Institute for Art and Olfaction, The Walters Art Museum, The Banff Centre, Städtische Galerie Bremen, and the Institute of Contemporary Art, Los Angeles. In his artwork Goeltzenleuchter tries to "explore the dynamics between individuals and the cities and institutions which shape those relationships" through attempts to interpret public places such as crowded cities like Los Angeles.

Awards 
 Creative Catalyst Award (2014, won for the Olfactory Memoirs workshops)
 Park Social (2021, won for The Olfactory Present: By Means of Smoke)

Creative works

Art 
 Sillage
 2014, Institute of Contemporary Art, Los Angeles
 2016, The Walters Art Museum, Baltimore, MD
 Volatile!
 2016, The Poetry Foundation, Chicago, IL
Odophonics
2016, San Diego Art Institute, San Diego, CA
Scents of Exile
2021, Olfactory Art Keller Gallery, New York, NY
2021, Städtische Galerie Bremen, Kunsthalle Bremen, Paula Modersohn-Becker Museum, Germany
2022, Art Gallery of Alberta, Canada

Literature 
 "Scenting the Antiseptic Institution", in Designing with Smell, (2017, London: Routledge,  ed. Victoria Henshaw)
“The olfactory counter-monument: Active smelling and the politics of wonder in the contemporary museum", in Olfactory Art and the Political in an Age of Resistance, (2021, London: Routledge, eds. Gwenn-Aël Lynn and Debra Riley Parr)

References

External links
 

1976 births
Artists from San Diego
Olfactory art

Living people